Stéphane Neville (born 20 October 1973 in Marseille, France) is a French singer, composer, actor and director.

Biography 
Stéphane Neville studies music and acting at the Marseilles conservatory. He plays in festivals and has opened for concerts by Norma Ray, Sylvie Joly, Hélène Segara.

Neville has played in many musicals in France and in Asia : Le Petit Prince by Richard Cocciante, Les enfants du soleil by Didier Barbelivien, Don Juan by Félix Gray, Roméo et Juliette by Gérard Presgurvic, Pinocchio by Marie-Jo Zarb. He also acts in movies and writes soundtracks for plays and films.

Musicals 

 2002-2003 : Le Petit Prince by Richard Cocciante and Elisabeth Anaïs, dir Jean-Louis Martinoty - Casino de Paris : the king
 2004 : Les Enfants du Soleil by Didier Barbelivien and Cyril Assous - Marseille, Lyon : David Atlan
 2005-2006 : Don Juan by Félix Gray, dir Gilles Maheu - Palais des congrès de Paris, Seoul : Raphaël and Don Juan
 2007-2008 : Le Petit Prince by Richard Cocciante and Elisabeth Anaïs, dir Jean-Louis Martinoty - Hong Kong, Shanghai
 2009-2011 : Cendrillon, le spectacle musical by Gérald Sybleyras and Etienne de Balasy, dir Agnès Bourry - Théâtre Mogador : the prince
 2011 : 80 jours : Un pari est un pari by Marie-Jo Zarb and Moria Némo - Zénith d'Orléans : Phileas Fogg
 2012-2013 : Roméo et Juliette by Gérard Presgurvic, dir Redha -  Japan, China : Benvolio
 2013 : Pinocchio by Marie-Jo Zarb and Moria Némo, dir Marie-Jo Zarb - Théâtre de Paris, tour : Gepetto

Filmography

Actor 
 2001 : Le Nouveau Jean-Claude by Didier Tronchet
 2002 : Les Marins perdus by Claire Devers
 2005 : Le monde est petit by Florence Thibaudat, short
 2010 : La liberté de Casanova by R. Vernerey, short

Musician 
 2008 : Mitfahrgelegenheit by Alexander Shulz, song A bon entendeur
 2010 : La liberté de Casanova by R. Vernerey, short
 2012 : Love collection by Antoine Lhonoré-Piquet, song I don't know

Director  
 2012 : Tant de temps, documentary about Henri Salvador
 2014 : Pas le droit à l'erreur by Jonah, clip
 2014 : Wish by The Bab's, clip
 2014 : Above you by The Bab's, clip
 2014 : Entendez-vous by Cécile Corbel, clip
 2015 : The Unrecalled, short
 2016 : Soy by Sebastien El Chato, clip
 2016 : La fille sans nom by Cécile Corbel and Faada Freddy

Theatre 
 2015 : L'héritage était-il sous la jupe de Papa ?, cowritten by Laurence Briata and Nicolas Ronceux, dir by Cécile Fertout and Nicolas Ronceux, Paris

Collaborations (sound, graphics) 
 2012-2013 : Accalmies passagères by Xavier Daugreilh
 2013-2014 : Laurette de Paname by, dir and with Laure Bontaz - France, South Korea, South America

Discography

Albums 
 2002 : Le Petit Prince
 2004 : Les enfants du soleil
 2009 : Cendrillon

Singles 
 2009 : La vie de château from Cendrillon
 2012 : I don't know
 2013 : Un faux départ with the collectif Les grandes voix des comédies musicales

Collaborations 
 2016 : Heyhey by Gwladys Fraioli

DVD 
 2002 : Le Petit Prince
 2004 : Les enfants du soleil
 2009 : Cendrillon

References

External links 
  Official site
  Biographie
 

Living people
1973 births
French film directors
21st-century French singers
21st-century French male singers